Loma morhua, also known as Loma branchialis, is a species of microsporidian parasite, infecting fish. It forms xenoparasitic complexes of the cell-hypertrophy tumour type, and is found in the gills of the Atlantic cod Gadus morhua. It is apansporoblastic, unikaryotic, disporoblastic and undergoes partial development in parasitophorous vacuoles, while lacking plasmodial stages. It produces one or two spores in a vacuole, having tubules in the parasitophorous vacuoles.

References

Further reading

MacLeod, Michael J., "In vitro Study of the Microsporidian Parasite Loma morhua, Using Cod-derived Cells and Novel Culture Techniques" (2012). Theses and Dissertations (Comprehensive). Paper 1127. http://scholars.wlu.ca/etd/1127.

External links

WORMS

Microsporidia